The 1926–27 British Home Championship was a football tournament played between the British Home Nations during the 1926–27 season. It was shared by England and Scotland after a series of high scoring draws in the opening matches left England, Wales and Ireland well behind with Scotland ahead, only for England to defeat Scotland in the deciding game with a late winning goal by Dixie Dean – the first time the Scots had lost since 1924, and their first loss at home since 1906.

Table

Results

References

 British Home Championship 1919-20 to 1938-1939  - dates, results, tables and top scorers at RSSSF

External links
 Scotland v England video footage from Pathé News (no sound)

1926–27 in English football
1926–27 in Scottish football
Brit
1927 in British sport
1926-27
1926 in British sport
1926–27 in Northern Ireland association football